Gilberto with Turrentine is an album by Brazilian samba and bossa nova singer Astrud Gilberto and American saxophonist Stanley Turrentine featuring performances recorded in 1971 released on the CTI label.

Reception
The AllMusic review calls the album a "set that had some mildly entertaining moments."

Track listing
 "Wanting Things" (Burt Bacharach, Hal David) – 2:35   
 "Brazilian Tapestry" (Eumir Deodato) – 5:10   
 "To a Flame" (Stephen Stills) – 3:17   
 "Solo el Fin (For All We Know)" (Fred Karlin, Arthur James, Robb Wilson) – 3:10   
 "Zazueira" (Jorge Ben) – 3:40   
 "Ponteio" (José Carlos Capinam, Edú Lobo) – 3:35   
 "Traveling Light" (Deodato, Martha Everett) – 3:25   
 "Vera Cruz" (Fernando Brant, Gene Lees, Milton Nascimento) – 5:05   
 "Historia de Amor (Love Story)" (Alfonso Alpin, Carl Sigman, Francis Lai) – 3:29   
 "Where There's a Heartache (There Must Be a Heart)" (Bacharach, David) – 3:10
 "Just Be You"  (Astrud Gilberto) – 2:29 Bonus track on CD reissue   
 "The Puppy Song" (Harry Nilsson) – 3:21 Bonus track on CD reissue    
 "Polytechnical High" (Deodato, Everett) – 2:48 Bonus track on CD reissue   
Recorded at Van Gelder Studio in Englewood Cliffs, New Jersey on January 13 (tracks 9–11), February 1 (tracks 4 & 13), February 4 (tracks 1, 3, 7 & 12), March 19 (tracks 2 & 5), and April 6 (track 6 & 8), 1971

Personnel
Astrud Gilberto – vocals
Stanley Turrentine – tenor saxophone (tracks 2, 5, 6 & 8) 
Eumir Deodato – electric piano, arranger, conductor 
Emanuel Green, George Marge, Hubert Laws, Romeo Penque – flute (tracks 2, 5, 7, 8 & 10) 
Gene Bertoncini (tracks 1, 3, 4, 7, 10 & 12), Sivuca (tracks 2, 5, 6, 8) – guitar 
Sam Brown (tracks 1, 2, 5, 6, 8, 12 & 13), Bob Mann (tracks 3, 4, 7, 9 & 12) – electric guitar
Toots Thielemans – harmonica (tracks 6 & 11) 
Ron Carter (tracks 1–3, 5–8 & 11), Russell George (tracks 4 & 9–13) – bass 
Dennis Seiwell (tracks 4, 9, 10 & 13), Dom Um Romão (tracks 2, 5 & 11), João Palma (tracks 1, 3, 7 & 12) – drums 
Airto Moreira – percussion (tracks 2, 5 & 11) 
Emanuel Green, Gene Orloff, Harry Katzman, Joe Malin, Julie Held, Paul Gershman – violin (tracks 1–5 & 7–10) 
Harold Coletta – viola (tracks 1, 2, 4, 7–10) 
George Ricci – cello (tracks 1–5 & 7–10)

References

CTI Records albums
Astrud Gilberto albums
Stanley Turrentine albums
1971 albums
Albums produced by Creed Taylor
Albums arranged by Eumir Deodato
Albums recorded at Van Gelder Studio